Khondkar Nazmul Huda (died 1975) was a veteran of the Bangladesh Liberation war. The Bangladesh government awarded him the title of Bir Bikrom for his bravery in the war of independence.

Early life 
Huda's ancestral home is in Kodalia village of Nagarkanda upazila of Faridpur district. His father's name was Khandaker Moazzem Hossain and his mother's name was Badrun Nesha Khatun. His wife's name is Nilufar Huda. They have one son Ehtesham Huda and one daughter Nahid Izahar Khan, who was elected as a Member of Parliament of Bangladesh Awami League from the reserved women's seat in the 11th National Assembly.

Career 
Huda was commissioned in the Corps of Engineers in the Pakistan Army in 1963. For some time in 1964-65 he worked as a Platoon Leader under Lt. General Javed Nasir as Company Commander. On January 3, 1968, he was arrested along with many others as accused in the Agartala conspiracy case. He was the 26th accused. In 1969, he was acquitted along with Sheikh Mujibur Rahman. But was dismissed.

When the Bangladesh Liberation war started, he jumped into this war. He was then included in the Bangladesh Army as a Major of the East Bengal Regiment. After the assassination of Bangabandhu in 1975, he was killed along with Khaled Musharraf and ATM Haider in the November coup.

Liberation war 
Barni BOP of Chaugachha upazila in Jessore district was a base of an under-strength Company of the Pakistan Army's 33rd Punjabis. There were about 75 Pakistani soldiers with 3 3-inch Mortars. Due to that base, the Mukti Bahini personnel could not operate in the area. In early August, Khandaker Nazmul Huda decided to attack. On 5 August 1971 two companies of freedom fighters, led by a Platoon of the 1st East Bengal Regiment under his leadership attacked the base. The Pakistan Army retreated from the camp leaving behind 15 bodies. The Pakistan Army launched a counterattack and Huda had to defend the taken base.

Huda was the sub-sector commander of Boyra of Sector 8. A  number of battles took place in the sub-sector. On 20–21 November, a fierce battle took place with the Pakistani forces at Garibpur in Chougachha. Besides, the Mukti Bahini carried out numerous ambush, demolition and surprise attacks.

Death 
Huda was killed in the 7 November 1975 Bangladesh coup d'état, he had the rank of Colonel in the Bangladesh Army.

References 

People from Faridpur District
Recipients of the Bir Bikrom
1975 deaths
Bangladesh Army officers
Mukti Bahini personnel
Recipients of the Independence Day Award